A98 or A-98 may refer to:

 A98 road (Great Britain), a major road in the United Kingdom
 A 98 motorway (Germany)
 Dutch Defence, in the Encyclopaedia of Chess Openings